Anna Wallén (born 1980) is a Swedish Social Democratic Party politician.

She was elected member of the Riksdag for the period 2010–2018, from the Västmanland County constituency.

References

1980 births
Living people
Members of the Riksdag from the Social Democrats
Women members of the Riksdag
Members of the Riksdag 2010–2014
Members of the Riksdag 2014–2018
21st-century Swedish women politicians